Acacia montana, commonly known as mallee wattle, is  a shrub species endemic to south-eastern Australia. The species was first formally described in 1842 by English botanist George Bentham from plant material collected from the "highlands near the Liverpool Plains" in New South Wales.
The Latin specific epithet montana refers to mountains or coming from mountains.

References

montana
Flora of New South Wales
Flora of Queensland
Flora of South Australia
Flora of Victoria (Australia)
Fabales of Australia
Plants described in 1842